Carlton is a village and civil parish in the Selby District of North Yorkshire, England.

According to the 2001 UK census, Carlton parish had a population of 1,829, increasing to 1,934 at the 2011 Census. The village was historically part of the West Riding of Yorkshire until 1974 but is now part of is now part of Selby district.

Holy Family Catholic High School is a secondary school located in the village. Carlton Primary School, which was called Carlton-in-Snaith Community Primary School prior to 2020, is also located in the village.

History

Odddfellows Arms
The unusually named Odddfellows Arms public house is in the village. During the 1980s, a mistake by a signwriter resulted in the incorrect spelling of the name Oddfellows. In 1994, the brewery tried to correct this, only to face a backlash by the locals. The pub has since closed, been listed for housing and then refurbished and re-opened with the unusual name still above the door.  Until 1850 the Odddfellows was known as the Red Lion and is believed to have served the public since 1750.

Carlton Towers

Carlton Towers is a Grade I listed Victorian stately home located in Carlton. The house was designed by Edward Welby Pugin and stands in a 250-acre estate. The house is the Yorkshire home of the 18th Duke of Norfolk but, since 1991, has been lived in, and run, by Lord Gerald Fitzalan-Howard and his family. Lord Gerald is a younger brother of the current Duke of Norfolk. Although the family still live in part of the house, it is now largely used for wedding receptions and similar events. The house in now used for weddings, events and has appeared on television and in magazines.

In 1777, in response to a public petition, Thomas Stapleton of Carlton Towers built a toll bridge to the south of the village over the River Aire, to encourage the flax trade. In 1928, the West riding authority replaced the toll bridge, with an iron construction upstream. The remains of the old bridge and toll booth are now Grade 1 listed and visible from the new bridge.

Carlton railway station 

Carlton Towers railway station served the village with a passenger service from 1885 to 1932 on the Hull and Barnsley Railway. It closed to goods traffic in 1959.

Notable people

 Arthur Hinsley, Catholic cardinal, archbishop
 Thomas Thwing, Catholic educator, conspiracist
Nigel Adams, Conservative Member of Parliament

References

External links

 Holy Family RC High School

Villages in North Yorkshire
Civil parishes in North Yorkshire
Selby District